General elections were held in Venezuela on 3 December 1978. The presidential elections were won by Luis Herrera Campins of Copei, who received 46.6% of the vote. Although Copei received more votes, Democratic Action won the most seats in the Chamber of Deputies, whilst the two parties won 21 seats each in the Senate. Voter turnout was 87.6%.

Results

President

Congress

References

1978 in Venezuela
Venezuela
Elections in Venezuela
Presidential elections in Venezuela
Election and referendum articles with incomplete results